The National Blue Trail (in Hungarian: Országos Kéktúra, Kéktúra or simply OKT) is a national trail in Hungary incorporated into the European Long Distance Walking Route E4. The route starts atop the Irottkő Mountain (884 m) on the Austrian-Hungarian border then cuts across Hungary eventually ending 1,168 km later at the village of Hollóháza by the Hungarian-Slovakian border. (Interactive map). The name of the Kéktúra (Blue Trail) is a reference to the marking of the path itself: it is a horizontal blue stripe between two white stripes. All segments of the trail are freely accessible to the public; no fees have to be paid or permits obtained, there is only one ferry to take over the Danube between Visegràd and Nagymaros where you have to purchase a ticket.

During its course the Blue Trail visits arguably the most beautiful natural and man-made sights of Hungary, e.g. more than a dozen forts and castles, lookout towers, three World Heritage Sites of Hungary (the panorama of Budapest from the hills, the old village of Hollókő and the Stalactite Cave of Aggtelek), Lake Balaton, the Danube Bend, and the spent volcanoes of the Basin of Tapolca, etc.

According to the latest GPS survey conducted in 2020, its total length was measured to be 1168.2 km and the total elevation change (climb) was found to be 30,213 metres in a Western-Eastern direction over the whole route.

History of the National Blue Trail 

The National Blue Trail (simply Blue Trail, or Tour) was the first long distance walking route not only in Hungary but in the whole of Europe. Its path was first signed in 1938; its length was 910 km in that time. A lot of Hungarian hikers began the completion of the Trail after World War II, so the Nature Rambler Section of the Lokomotív Sport Club of Budapest announced the National walk on the "blue" hiking path in 1952.

The Nature Rambler Section's Committee of Railway Employee's Union developed this issue on the national level in 1953, and published the first brochure, which showed the whole route in map sketches.

Later, organisation and control of the National Blue Trail movement was taken over by the Hungarian Rambler's Association "Friends of Nature" (MTSZ) in 1961.

But the Blue Trail was known only among hikers until the beginning of the 1980s, when Hungarian TV broadcast a series about the route of the Trail. The organiser and editor of this series was Pál Rockenbauer, who at that time worked in the editorial office named "Natura" of the Hungarian TV. Pál Rockenbauer organised a small team and they completed the National Blue Trail during 76 days in an east-west direction. They carried everything (cameras, films and other equipment) in their backpacks and undertook the whole project without any external help.

Their work was very successful: the series drew people's attention to the National Blue Trail. Everybody got to know the Trail in Hungary and many people began the completion of it. A lot of hikers have the series on video or DVD at home. Pál Rockenbauer committed suicide in 1987 during a hike on the paths of the Blue Trail close to village Katalinpuszta at the foot of the Naszály Mountain. A wooden headboard column cherishes his memory on that place beside the path of the National Blue Trail.

Validation of completion 

The whole route or its sections can be completed for amusement without any validation. However, the completion of the Blue Trail is a very important event in the life of Hungarian hikers, so generally they have their own personal completion brochure (its price is 1990 HUF, about 5,5 Euro in 2020).

There are 147 checkpoints (stamping places) on the route of the Blue Trail. The participants have to validate the completion of the tour by passing all checkpoints. This can be verified by dating and stamping of the appropriate box in their personal completion brochure. It is required to stamp at every checkpoint. If this is not possible (because the stamp is not available or the hike is started or finished at a place without a stamp), it is acceptable to obtain a stamp from a nearby shop, mayor's office, etc. or taking a clearly recognisable photo of the location and the hiker. The National Blue Trail has its own stamps with the name of the appropriate places. They are located in pubs or shops in the villages, on railway stations usually in the ticket offices, but many times they are in the forest in their standard blue-white boxes equipped on trees or on the fences of forester's lodges.

As can be seen on the picture in the left side, there are different types of stamps along the route of the Blue Trail. This picture is a sheet from a personal completion brochure, which is already validated by stamps.

The stamp of Koldusszállás is located on a tree in its small iron box beside the access road of the hunter's lodge. It is a simple rubber stamp with the name of the place. 
At Gerecse üdülő (Children's holiday resort of Gerecse) the metal box of the stamp is equipped on the corner of the fence. This stamp is an iron stamp with chiselled letters. 
The stamp of homestead Pusztamarót is similar to the stamp of Koldusszállás. Its box is on a pine tree at the edge of the great meadow. 
The stamp of Bányahegyi erdészház (forester's lodge of Bányahegy) was stolen on the date of the hike, so the participant had to find another place to obtain a validation in his book. This was the pub named "Hubertus" in village Tardos - its distance is about 3 km from the original stamping place. There are two similar stamps, because the hiker finished here a hike and began another one later.

Usually the hikers have to start or finish a trip at a checkpoint. In this case, they have to stamp twice at same checkpoint: at the finish of a hike and at the start of the next hiking trip if these are in two different date. If this checkpoint is at the beginning or the end of an official section of the  Blue Trail, there are two boxes at this checkpoint in the personal completion brochure. In other cases there is only one box, but the hikers have to stamp twice: first in the box and later above or below it - where they can find enough place. Of course if somebody only reaches a checkpoint and goes further, one stamp is enough.

Photos are accepted if they show the place and the person together. After the completion of the whole path of the Trail, the brochure has to be taken or sent to the Hungarian Ramblers’ Association in Budapest or local to a branch, where the completion will be checked and validated, after which a commemorative badge is issued.

Awards for the completion of the Blue Trail 

Anyone who completes the Blue Trail is eligible for the Blue Trail Badge of MTSZ. This is free of charge to members of the MTSZ; non-members have to pay production costs. The badge is an irregular quadrangle with a road leading towards mountains with a blue signed post and below in red stripe with the following: "Országos Kék-túra MTSZ". MTSZ prepares and hands over the badge - if it is possible - during a small ceremony. A record of those who have completed the trail is also kept by the Association.

The number of people who have completed the Trail is more than 4100 in year 2007. It is also possible to complete the Trail more than once.

There are three sections on the route of the Blue Trail which have their own badges. These can be obtained without completing the whole Trail; however, by completing the Trail one is also eligible for these.

- Dorogtól Nógrádig túramozgalom (Hikers’ Movement between Dorog and Nógrád) through the Pilis Mountains, Buda Mountains and Börzsöny Mountains – 138.8 km, 4490 m total climb.

- Mátra-Bükk útjain túramozgalom (Hikers’ Movement through the paths of the Mátra and Bükk Mountains) – 120.0 km, 4360 m total climb

- Veszprém megyei kéktúra túramozgalom (Veszprém County Blue Trail Hikers’ Movement) between Sümeg and Bodajk through the Balaton Uplands and the Bakony Mountains – 247.8 km, 5360 m total climb

The Children's Blue Trail (GYKT) can be completed by children between the age of 6 and 14 hiking 300 km on the Blue Trail. It is divided in 9 regions:

- Mountains of Kőszeg – Little Hungarian Plain 
- Balaton Uplands 
- Bakony Mountains 
- Vértes Mountains – Hilly Country of Gerecse  
- Pilis Mountains – Mountains of Buda 
- Börzsöny Mountains – Hilly Country of Cserhát 
- Mátra Mountains 
- Bükk Mountains – Hilly Country of Aggtelek 
- Hilly Country of Cserehát – Mountains of Zemplén

Children who complete at least 50 km distance in a region obtain the regional badge of Children's Blue Trail (GYKT); at most one badge can be earned in each region independently of the distance covered. If the combined  length of the completed sections reaches 300 km, they obtain the GYKT badge. In case of organising and leading a group of children, the leader can obtain the badge, if the number of the children is at least 6.

Completion of GYKT counts towards gaining the OKT badge as well. The validation of the completion is the same as in the OKT.

Detailed description of the route

Kőszeg Mountains and the Small Plain 
142,1 km, 710 metres climb

 

The route of the Blue Trail begins on the top of the Írott-kő Mountain (884 m) at the feet of the lookout tower on the Austrian-Hungarian border and leads among the mountains of the Kőszegi-hegység (Kőszeg Mountains) until the town of Kőszeg. It passes by the Hétvezér-forrás (Spring of the Seven Leaders), the lookout tower of Óház-tető and the Calvary Church of Kőszeg. After Kőszeg, the Blue Trail reaches the wide plains of Rába River. The route of the Trail crosses the Little Hungarian Plain in northwest-southeastern direction via Sárvár – where the route crosses the Rába River – until Sümeg. The total climb on the 120 km long plain section is only 460 metres.

Stamping places:  
Lookout Tower of Írottkő, Hétvezér-forrás (Spring of Seven Leaders), Kőszeg, Tömörd, Ablánci Malomcsárda (Water Mill Tavern of Ablánc), Szeleste, Bögöt, Csényeújmajor, Sárvár railway station, Gérce, forester's lodge of Rózsáskert, hunter's lodge of Hidegkút, village Káld, village Hosszúpereszteg, forester's lodge of Szajk at Lakes of Szajk, Ötvös railway station, Kisvásárhely, Sümeg railway station

Balaton Highlands 
129.9 km, 2870 metres climb

At the town of Sümeg the Blue Trail reaches the edge of the plain and the route goes on among the 200–300 metres tall hills of the Balaton Highlands. The path visits the castle ruins of Tátika and the Buddhist Stupa at village of Zalaszántó. Later the path reaches the old, extinct volcanoes at the coast of Lake Balaton. Among others the route visits Szent György-hegy (415 m), the Badacsony (437 m), Gulács (393 m) and the Csobánc (376 m). The tops of the extinct volcanoes rise 250–300 meters above the Káli Basin. After the basin the Blue Trail goes among the hills of the highlands until it reaches Nagyvázsony.

Stamping places:  
Sümeg railway station, forester's lodge of Sarvaly, Zalaszántó, Rezi, Gyöngyösi csárda (Tavern of Gyöngyös), Hévíz bus terminal, railway station of Keszthely, Vállus, Lesenceistvánd, Tapolca railway station, Tourist Hostel of Szent György-hegy, Szigliget Castle, Badacsonytördemic railway station, Káptalantóti, Mindszentkálla, Szentbékkálla, Balatonhenye, tourist shelter of Csicsó, Nagyvázsony.

Bakony Mountains 
117.9 km, 2490 metres climb

Departing from Nagyvázsony the route reaches the Bakony (Bakony Mountains), which is the first member in the long row of medium mountains in Hungary. First the Blue Trail climbs to the top of Kab-hegy (599 m) and descends to the valley to the railway station of Városlőd-Kislőd. After Bakonybél the Trail visits the tallest peak of Bakony, Kőris-hegy (700 m). After Zirc the route of the Blue Trail leads among the hills of the Eastern Bakony. This area is the oldest of Hungarian medium mountains, it has only mild hills and valleys.

Stamping places: 
Nagyvázsony, forester's lodge of Kab-hegy, Úrkút, Városlőd-Kislőd railway station, Németbánya, Bakonybél, peak of Kőris Mountain, Borzavár, Zirc railway station, Bakonynána, Jásd, Tés, Kisgyón, Bakonykúti, Fehérvárcsurgó, Bodajk

Vértes Mountains and the Gerecse Hills 
115.7 km, 3110 metres climb

The route of the Blue Trail goes through the forest of the about 400 meters high volcanic plateau of the Vértes and reaches the Gerecse Hills. From the tops of the last hills of this region opens a very good view towards the Danube and Slovakia.

Stamping places: 
Bodajk, Csókakő, Gánt, Mindszentpuszta homestead, Kőhányáspuszta, Castle of Gesztes, Szárliget railway station, tourist shelter of Somlyóvár, hunter's lodge of Koldusszállás, ruins of the forester's lodge of Bányahegy, children's holiday resort on the Gerecse Mountain, Pusztamarót homestead, pilgrimage place Péliföldszentkereszt, Mogyorósbánya, Tokod, Dorog railway station.

Pilis Mountains and Mountains of Buda 
100.7 km, 2880 metres climb

The Pilis Mountains lie in the big bend of the Danube, where it turns towards southern direction from the earlier western-eastern direction.  The route of the Blue Trail is similar to a big, inverse "Ω" letter here; the Trail first goes in southern direction until the area of Budapest, only touching the forests of the capital (Mountains of Buda). Not much later the path returns to the Pilis Mountains and reaches the Danube at the Danube Bend at Visegrád, a popular tourist destination known for its castle atop the hill.

Stamping places: 
Dorog railway station, Klastrompuszta, Piliscsaba railway station, a pub named Muflon Itató on the Zsíroshegy, Hüvösvölgy Children's Railway Station, peak of Hármashatár-hegy, Virágos-nyereg (Virágos Col), Rozália Brickyard, Kevély-nyereg (Col of Kevély), Pilisszentkereszt, the peak of Dobogókő (700 m), forester's lodge of Sikáros, Pilisszentlászló, forester's lodge of Pap-rét, peak of Nagy-Villám, ticket office of the ferry in village Visegrád

Börzsöny Mountains and Hilly Country of Cserhát 
157.1 km, 4890 metres climb

The Blue Trail goes further on the left coast of the Danube and climbs the peaks of the Börzsöny (Nagy-Hideg-hegy: 864 m and Csóványos: 938 m) and after the peak of Naszály (652 m) it reaches the Cserehát Hills. Hollókő, a World Heritage Site, lies among the hills and on the Trail. After the peak of Tepke (566 m) the route reaches the Mátra Mountains.

Stamping places:  
Nagymaros railway station, Tourist Hostel of Törökmező, Tourist Hostel of Kisinóc, Tourist Hostel of Nagy-Hideg-hegy (864 m), Nógrád railway station, Magyarkút, Katalinpuszta, Ősagárd, Felsőpetény, Alsópetény, Romhány, Kétbodony, Becske, Szandaváralja, Cserhátsurány, Nógrádsipek, Hollókő, Nagymező-puszta homestead, Nagybárkány, Mátraverebély.

Mátra Mountains 
65.1 km, 2480 metres climb

Mátra is the highest mountain range in Hungary; the Blue Trail climbs the two highest peaks: the Galyatető (964 m) and the Kékestető (1014 m) – the latter being the highest peak of Hungary. After the peaks the Trail descends on the long eastern ridge of the mountains to Sirok and later to Szarvaskő.

Stamping places: 
Mátraverebély, Tourist Hostel of Ágasvár, Mátraszentistván, the peak of Galyatető, forester's lodge of Nyírjes, Vörösmarty Tourist Hostel, Mátraháza, the peak of Kékestető, forester's lodge of Hármashatár, Sirok railway station, Restaurant Hunor in Sirok, forester's lodge of Rozsnakpuszta, Szarvaskő

Bükk Mountains and Aggtelek Hills 
116.6 km, 3150 metres climb

The path climbs the 800–900 metres high plateau of the Bükk Mountains, then it descends into the valley of Sajó River. Later on the National Blue Trail visits the stalactite cave of Aggtelek, a World Heritage Site, in the Aggtelek Karst and then reaches the valley of the Bódva River.

Stamping places: 
Szarvaskő, Telekessy Guesthouse, Bélapátfalva, Cserepes-kő Cave Shelter, Bánkút Ski House,  Mályinka,  Uppony, Putnok railway station, Kelemér, Gömörszőlős, Zádorfalva, Aggtelek,  Jósvafő, ruins of Derenk, ruins of Szabó-pallag forester's lodge, Bódvaszilas railway station.

Cserehát Hills and the Mountains of Zemplén 
160.8 km, 3550 metres climb

The route of the Blue Trail crosses the Cserehát Hills and reaches the last segment of the North Hungarian Mountains, the Zemplén Mountains. After crossing the hills from west to east, the path takes a sharp northwesterly turn near Sátoraljaújhely and finally climbs the highest peak of the mountains: the Nagy-Milic (895 m) which stands on the Hungarian-Slovakian border. Finally it descends to the village of Hollóháza.  The final point of the National Blue Trail, which is marked with a small monument, is located here.

Stamping places: 
Bódvaszilas railway station, Tornabarakony, Rakacaszend, Felsővadász, Abaújszolnok,  Baktakék,  Fancsal, Gibárt Hydroelectric Power Station, Hernádcéce, Boldogkőváralja Railway Station, Mogyoróska, Regéc, Istvánkút hunter's lodge of, Eszkála hunter's lodge,  Makkoshotyka, Cirkáló-tanya farmstead, Bányi-nyereg (Col of Bány), Vágáshuta, Nagyhuta,  Nagybózsva, Füzér, Bodó-rét (Bodó Beadow), Hollóháza

Further information about the route of the Blue Trail: European long-distance paths

External links 
 Interactive map
 Official website of the National Blue Trail
 Hörpölin&son’s website about the Blue Trail – in English with travelogues and more than 1000 photos 
 E&T Kéktúra oldala – this is a website of young people walking the path of the Blue Trail with more thousand photos – in Hungarian 
 kektura.eu - The National Blue Trail – a website about the Blue Trail with photos, elevation profiles, Google Earth files and travelogues – in English and Hungarian
 Heyjoe's website for logging completed segments
 Gyula Rakk's website showing the changes in the trail over the years

Hiking trails in Hungary
European long-distance paths